Turnhouse railway station served the suburb of Turnhouse, Edinburgh, Scotland from 1897 to 1930 on the Forth Bridge Connecting Lines of the North British Railway.

History 
The station opened on 23 August 1897 by the North British Railway. To the east was the goods yard and to the southwest was the goods yard, which opened before the station in 1890. It closed in 1929. The station closed on 22 September 1930.

References

External links 

Disused railway stations in Edinburgh
Former North British Railway stations
Railway stations in Great Britain opened in 1897
Railway stations in Great Britain closed in 1930
1897 establishments in Scotland
1930 disestablishments in Scotland